The Hopkins River, a perennial river of the Glenelg Hopkins catchment, is located in the Western District of Victoria, Australia.

Course and features
The river descends  over its  course. The river and its tributaries drain much of Lake Bolac; and north of  the river descends over the  Hopkins Falls.

Together with the Merri River, the Hopkins flows through the regional centre of Warrnambool; and the river passes by the end of the Great Ocean Road near Allansford.

River health 
The Hopkins River is in extremely poor health with less than 5% of the river having natural bush and vegetation.

Re-vegetation 
The Hopkins River Re-vegetation Project (HRRP) was commenced in 2016 by the Ellerslie Residents Group Inc.

Phase 1 
Phase 1 of the HRRP project commenced in 2016 in Ellerslie. The Project is located between the Hopkins Highway bridge and the historic bridge.

Phase 2 & 3 
Phases 2 & 3 of the project are planned to take place on the eastern bank between the phase 1 site and the Stony Creek Junction.

Etymology 
The river was named in 1836 by Major Thomas Mitchell after a friend, Sir John Paul Hopkins.

References

External links
 

Glenelg Hopkins catchment
Rivers of Barwon South West (region)
Rivers of Grampians (region)
Warrnambool
Western District (Victoria)